Dear Mr. Sinatra is a 2006 album by jazz singer and swing jazz guitarist John Pizzarelli. Pizzarelli is backed by the Clayton/Hamilton Jazz Orchestra, led by Jeff Hamilton and John Clayton.

Track listing
"Ring-A-Ding Ding" (Sammy Cahn, Jimmy Van Heusen) – 3:37
"You Make Me Feel So Young" (Mack Gordon, Josef Myrow) – 4:00
"How About You?" (Ralph Freed, Burton Lane) – 2:43
"If I Had You" (Jimmy Campbell, Reginald Connelly, Ted Shapiro) – 4:50
"Witchcraft" (Cy Coleman, Carolyn Leigh) – 4:14
"I've Got You Under My Skin" (Cole Porter) – 3:26
"Nice 'N' Easy" (Alan Bergman, Marilyn Bergman, Lewis Spence) – 2:47
Medley: "I See Your Face Before Me"/"In the Wee Small Hours of the Morning" (Howard Dietz, Arthur Schwartz)/(Bob Hilliard, David Mann) – 4:16
"Can't We Be Friends?" (Paul James, Kay Swift) – 3:57
"Yes Sir, That's My Baby" (Walter Donaldson, Gus Kahn) – 3:04
"Last Dance" (Cahn, Van Heusen) – 2:23

Personnel
John Pizzarellivocals, guitar
Jeff Hamiltondrums
John Claytonarrangement, double-bass
Clayton/Hamilton Jazz Orchestra
Don Sebesky, Dick Lieb and Quincy Jonesarrangements

References

2006 albums
John Pizzarelli albums
Frank Sinatra tribute albums
Vocal jazz albums
Telarc Records albums